The Insular Cases are a series of opinions by the Supreme Court of the United States in 1901 about the status of U.S. territories acquired in the Spanish–American War. Some scholars also include cases regarding territorial status decided up until 1914, and others include related cases as late as 1979. 
The term "insular" signifies that the territories were islands administered by the War Department's Bureau of Insular Affairs. Today, the categorizations and implications put forth by the Insular Cases still govern the United States' territories.

When the war ended in 1898, the United States had to answer the question of whether or not people in newly acquired territories were citizens, a question the country had never faced before. The preliminary answer came from a series of Supreme Court rulings, now known as the Insular Cases, which responded to the question of how American constitutional rights apply to those in United States territories. The Supreme Court held that full constitutional protection of rights does not automatically (or ex proprio vigore—i.e., of its own force) extend to all places under American control. This meant that inhabitants of unincorporated territories such as Puerto Rico—"even if they are U.S. citizens"—may lack some constitutional rights (e.g., the right to remain part of the United States in case of de-annexation) because they were not part of the United States. Today, many legal scholars such as José Julián Álvarez González, Christina Burnett, and others refer to the Insular Cases as a constitutional justification for colonialism and annexation of places not within United States boundaries. The Insular Cases "authorized the colonial regime created by Congress, which allowed the United States to continue its administration—and exploitation—of the territories acquired from Spain after the Spanish–American War." These Supreme Court rulings allowed for the United States government to extend unilateral power over these newly acquired territories.

The Court also established the doctrine of territorial incorporation, under which the Constitution applied fully only in incorporated territories such as Alaska and Hawaii. Incorporated territories are those that the United States Congress deems on a path to statehood. Meanwhile, the Supreme Court ruled the Constitution applied only partially in the newly unincorporated Puerto Rico, Guam and the Philippines. The Supreme Court created the distinction that unincorporated territories were not on the path to statehood, which effectively allowed for the Constitution to apply differently.

The rulings are widely considered racist. The Downes v. Bidwell called the people of the insular areas "alien races" and the De Lima v. Bidwell ruling termed them "savage tribes." The Downes v. Bidwell case further suggested the administration of "alien races" may be "impossible". The District Court of the Virgin Islands called out the cases' "racist doctrine" and the era's "intrinsically racist imperialism".

Background 
In 1898, the United States signed the Treaty of Paris (which entered into force on April 11, 1899), which ended the Spanish–American War and granted the United States the Philippines, Puerto Rico, and Guam. Additionally, Cuba remained under the jurisdiction of the United States Military Government until its independence on May 20, 1902. Since there was nothing in the United States Constitution about governing newly acquired territories, the government used the guideline from Title IX of the Treaty of Paris. Those that were born in Spain but living in one of the territories—known as —"could retain their Spanish citizenship", or even eventually have the option to become United States citizens. Title IX of the Treaty of Paris did not grant the same rights to the indigenous population. Edguardo Melendez writes, "Puerto Ricans and Filipinos—'the natives of the islands'—not only remained colonial subjects but became stateless peoples too: they were denied the right to keep their Spanish citizenship, as well as their right to become U.S. citizens."

After Title IX of the Treaty of Paris came the Foraker Act of 1900, which established American rule in Puerto Rico for all of the twentieth century. The act allowed the United States to appoint the governor, a portion of the legislature, and the entirety of the Puerto Rico Supreme Court. These two documents precede the Insular Cases and set a precedent on the status of the United States' new territories prior to the Supreme Court's rulings.

In addition to the Treaty of Paris and the Foraker Act, the Citizenship Clause found within the 14th Amendment of the United States Constitution informed the Insular Case decisions. Lisa Marie Perez of the Virginia Law Review writes "The Citizenship Clause of the Fourteenth Amendment provides that 'All persons born or naturalized in the United States, and subject to the jurisdiction thereof, are citizens of the United States. However, the Insular Cases soon set a precedent that the territories are not inherently part of the United States and therefore the Citizenship Clause or other portions of the United States Constitution do not automatically apply. Furthermore, the Citizenship Clause was crucial throughout the 1800s in the United States as the country expanded and full citizenship was extended. Yet, the discussion never centered around citizenship in terms of overseas expansion. Soon, the precedent from the Insular Cases became very different from early interpretations of the Citizenship Clause.

List of the Insular Cases 
Various authorities have listed what they consider are the legitimate constituents of the Insular Cases.

Juan R. Torruella, a judge on the U.S. Court of Appeals for the First Circuit (the federal appeals court with jurisdiction over the Federal Court for the District of Puerto Rico), considers that the landmark decisions consist of six fundamental cases only, all decided in 1901: "strictly speaking the Insular Cases are the original six opinions issued concerning acquired territories as a result of the 1898 Treaty of Paris". These six cases were:

 De Lima v. Bidwell, ; Argued: January 8–11, 1901; Decided: May 27, 1901
 Goetze v. United States, ; Argued: December 17–20, 1900; January 14–15, 1901; Decided: May 27, 1901
 Dooley v. United States, ; Argued: January 8–11, 1901. Decided: May 27, 1901
 Armstrong v. United States, ; Argued: January 8–11, 1901; Decided: May 27, 1901
 Downes v. Bidwell, ; Argued: January 8–11, 1901; Decided: May 27, 1901
 Huus v. New York and Porto Rico Steamship Co., ; Argued: January 11, 14, 1901; Decided: May 27, 1901
Other authorities, such as José Trías Monge, former Chief Justice of the Puerto Rico Supreme Court, states that the list also includes these additional two cases also decided in 1901:

 Dooley v. United States, 
 Fourteen Diamond Rings v. United States, ; Argued: December 17–20, 1900. Decided: December 2, 1901

Law professor Pedro A. Malavet wrote in his book America's Colony: The Political and Cultural Conflict Between the United States and Puerto Rico that while many law experts include cases from 1903 to 1979, some scholars limit the number of cases in the list to just nine, adding Crossman v. United States, .

The U.S. Congress passed a resolution that collected the relevant records, briefs, and oral arguments of the 1901 cases concerning the U.S. Territories. In the compilation, the cases considered at the time of their decision as the Insular Cases were DeLima, Goetze, Dooley, Dooley, Armstrong, Downes, Crossman, and Huus.

Six of the nine Insular Cases deal exclusively with Puerto Rico.

Constitutional law professor Efrén Rivera-Ramos argues that the "Insular Cases" designation has been extended beyond the first nine cases in 1901 to include additional cases decided between 1903 and 1914:

 Hawaii v. Mankichi, 
 Gonzales v. Williams, 
 Kepner v. United States, 
 Dorr v. United States, 
 Mendozana v. United States, 
 Rasmussen v. United States, 
 Trono v. United States, 
 Grafton v. United States, 
 Kent v. Porto Rico, 
 Kopel v. Bingham, 
 Dowdell v. United States, 
 Ochoa v. Hernández, 
 Ocampo v. United States, 

Some include the later Supreme Court rulings of:

 Balzac v. Porto Rico (1922)
 Dorr v. United States (1904)

In Balzac, the Supreme Court found that Puerto Ricans, extended statutory citizenship by the Jones Act (1917), are not guaranteed a trial by jury, an inherent aspect of the United States Constitution. Similarly, in Dorr v. United States (1904), the Supreme Court ruled against right to trial by jury for Philippines residents, another unincorporated territory at the time. These two cases exemplify the idea implemented by the Insular Cases that the Constitution does not automatically extend to territories , or by its own force.

Doctrine of incorporation 
The Insular Case decisions created a doctrine allowing for the United States to acquire and govern colonial territories. The most important doctrinal lines from the Insular Cases include the idea of incorporated and unincorporated territories and the overarching principle that the Constitution does not inherently extend to unincorporated territories. 

The first Insular Case, Downes v. Bidwell (1901), created the distinction between incorporated and unincorporated territories. The Supreme Court came to this decision by examining Congress' right to impose tariffs on states and territories. Bartholomew Sparrow writes that in Downes v. Bidwell, "the Court found that Congress could tax trade between Puerto Rico and the states. Puerto Rico was thus not a part of the United States for tariff purposes—contrary to the Uniformity Clause." Although the Uniformity Clause states that Congress must enforce tariffs equally throughout the United States, the Supreme Court created a distinction between territories that were fully part of the union and those that were not, allowing them to ignore the Uniformity Clause. The line drawn by the Supreme Court created "incorporated territories", those destined to be states, and "unincorporated territories", which were not on the path to statehood. In 1901 and the era of the Insular Cases, the areas that became unincorporated territories were Puerto Rico, Guam, and the Philippines. With the establishment of the legality of unincorporated territories, the Court also found that in these said territories, the Constitution "did not apply in full". This means the Constitution does not extend "" (by its own force) to unincorporated territories. Instead, it could be extended at Congress' discretion. The lines of reasoning from Downes v. Bidwell created legal precedent for the remainder of the Insular Cases.

In De Lima v. Bidwell (1901), the Supreme Court found "Puerto Rico was part of the United States for the purpose of the Uniformity Clause." Therefore, duties could not be collected from Puerto Rico. The Supreme Court set alternative precedents in Downes v. Bidwell and De Lima v. Bidwell based on the differing interpretation of the Uniformity Clause of the United States Constitution and the subsequent implications of these rulings.

Political debate 
The Insular Cases came at a time when America was building its empire. Throughout history, empire-building and colonial expansion have been a contentious topic. The reaction within the United States to the Insular decisions was no different, with both supporters and dissenters voicing their opinions. In Downes, Justice Henry Brown claimed that the United States should be able to possess the same power over the insular territories that Spain had. Krishanti Vigarajah argues that this allowed the insular territories to be seen as satellite colonies, and for the United States to exert colonial-style rule. This was controversial, due to the idea that the founding anti-colonial values of the United States were not compatible with exertion of colonial power.

The political debate surrounding the Insular Cases was split between expansionists and anti-expansionists, which largely followed Democratic-Republican party lines. Following the American Civil War and preceding the Spanish-American War, the Reconstruction Constitution that had guaranteed any inhabitants of American annexed territories the full benefit of United States citizenship and ultimate statehood. Historian Sam Erman notes that the strength of the Reconstruction Constitution had become weakened by the time of the Insular Cases, as a result of Southern Democrats' efforts to disenfranchise African-Americans in the South, and Republicans' waning support for Reconstruction measures.

For anti-expansionists, this discouraged overseas territorial acquisition during reconstruction by guaranteeing any annexed territories' eventual statehood and its people the full rights of citizenship.

Expansionists wished to separate U.S. action from the behavior of Spain, whose colonialism they viewed as motivated only by commercial interests and a continued desire to subjugate. The United States presented its own imperial ambitions as a path to liberation for former colonial subjects and an opportunity to gain republican government and modernity. However, expansionists also had to contend with questions about how to expand U.S. borders without extending citizenship to those they considered "alien".

American reaction 
Bartholomew Sparrow notes that almost all of the Insular Case opinions were 5–4 within the Supreme Court, demonstrating the contentious nature of the topic even from the highest voice of law in the United States. In Downes v. Bidwell (1901), the Supreme Court reached a decision after one of the most spirited discussions ever held within the sacred circle of the Supreme Court bench,' the Associated Press reported." Reactions to the Insular Cases also exemplify the divide that existed at the time in the United States government surrounding empire building.

Republicans, who favored expansion and authored the Foraker Act supported the decisions: "the decision is a complete vindication of the position held by the Republican party with respect to the power of Congress to legislate for Porto Rico and the Philippines." Additionally, "Solicitor General John Richards noted, 'they sustain to the fullest extent the so-called insular policy of the administration. The government now has the sanction of the Supreme Court for governing these islands as their needs require. These examples show the support for the decisions at the time they were handed down.

However, there were many who did not support the decisions. Many former congressmen spoke out against the decisions. Charles E. Littlefield wrote in the Harvard Law Review, "the Insular Cases, in the manner in which the results were reached, the incongruity of the results, and the variety of inconsistent views expressed by the different members of the court, are, I believe, without parallel in our judicial history." George. S. Boutwell, former congressman and U.S. Senator commented, "the opinion of the majority seems to justify the conclusion that the power of acquiring territories is an indefinite power." Thus, the divisive nature of the Insular decisions was revealed through the opinions held by those active in government.

Outside of the government, the announcement of the Downes v. Bidwell decision in 1901 drew the largest crowd in Supreme Court history, displaying the interest the American public had in the outcome of the case. Newspapers around the country also took great interest in the outcome of the Insular Cases, and many were highly critical of the decisions. The New York Herald wrote that the Supreme Court "by a bare majority of one holds that the constitution is supreme only in the States, and that a million square miles, or one-fourth of the national domain, and ten million people are subject to no law but the will of Congress." Furthermore, The Denver Post exclaimed the "Downes decision 'at one fell swoop' brought the United States 'into the ownership of colonies and putting us into the rank of land grabbing nations of Europe.

Scholarly criticism 

It is now commonly acknowledged that the decisions made in the Insular Cases were influenced by racist ideas of the period. Scholar Rick Baldoz notes that American political “anxieties about immigration, race, and economic competition” strongly influenced the debate surrounding the Insular Cases.

Downes and De Lima have been criticized for their inconsistency, and the alternative precedents sent in each one, in which Puerto Rico was first defined in Downes as not a "foreign country" but defined in De Lima as not part of the United States. 

The Insular Cases have also been criticized for having been inconsistent in application between the two largest insular territories, the Philippines and Puerto Rico. Puerto Rico was seen as "an important geo-strategic asset" for emerging U.S. imperialism and a gateway to Latin America, while insular control over the Philippines was a "temporary attachment born of political expediency". This was attributed to the relative geographic proximity of the two nations, and the relative commercial capabilities of each at the time.

Notably, American beliefs about race at the time also characterized the difference in treatment between Puerto Rico and the Philippines. Puerto Ricans were more likely to be viewed as white by Americans than Filipinos were. However, both Puerto Ricans and Filipinos were seen as too "alien" to be considered for U.S. citizenship and statehood, unlike other former U.S. territories that had achieved statehood. This has been criticized by scholar Mark Weiner as Teutonic Constitutionalism.

Writing in 2001, former Puerto Rico Supreme Court Chief Justice José Trías Monge contends that the Insular Cases were based on premises that would be legally and politically unacceptable in the 21st century, premises such as:

 Democracy and colonialism are "fully compatible".
 There is "nothing wrong when a democracy such as the United States engages in the business of governing other" subjects that have not participated in their democratic election process.
 People are not created equal, some races being superior to others.
 It is the "burden of the superior peoples, the white man's burden, to bring up others in their image, except to the extent that the nation which possesses them should in due time determine".

Scholar Krishanti Vignarajah has also argued that the courts decisions in the Insular Cases could have been considered judicial overreach. They were initially were considered a political issue, and the Treaty of Paris specified that "the civil rights and political status of the native inhabitants of the territories ... shall be determined by the Congress", but was later transformed into a legitimate judicial issue. This set a new standard for judicial involvement in issues of international affairs.

Judicial criticism and later challenges 
In Harris v. Rosario, 446 U.S. 651 (1980), the Court applied Califano v. Torres, 435 U.S. 1 (1978) in a succinct per curiam order, holding that less aid to Puerto Rican families with dependent children did not violate the Equal Protection Clause, because in U.S. territories Congress can discriminate against its citizens applying a rational basis review. Justice Thurgood Marshall wrote a staunch dissent, noting that Puerto Ricans are U.S. citizens and that the Insular Cases are questionable.

In Torres v. Puerto Rico, 442 U.S. 465 (1979), cited above, Justice William Brennan, with whom Justice Potter Stewart, Justice Marshall, and Justice Harry Blackmun joined, concurring in the judgment, cited Reid v. Covert, 354 U.S. 1, 14 (1957), in which Justice Hugo Black said the "concept that the Bill of Rights and other constitutional protections against arbitrary government are inoperative when they become inconvenient or when expediency dictates otherwise is a very dangerous doctrine and if allowed to flourish would destroy the benefit of a written Constitution and undermine the basis of our Government".

In United States v. Vaello Madero, 596 U.S. ___ (2022), Justice Neil Gorsuch concurred with the majority opinion excluding Puerto Rico from the Supplemental Security Income program, but he criticized the Insular Cases and stated that they are "shameful," "have no foundation in the Constitution and rest instead on racial stereotypes," and "deserve no place in our law."

The Supreme Court had the opportunity to overturn the Insular Cases in the case of Fitisemanu v. United States, but in October 2022, denied certiorari. The United States Court of Appeals for the Tenth Circuit had ruled in this case that the insular cases should stand.

Impacts 
The Philippines was recognized as an independent country in 1946, following World War II. Guam and Puerto Rico have remained unincorporated territories and are two amongst the sixteen existing insular areas. Baldoz suggests that U.S. rule over Puerto Rico as a result of the Insular Cases previewed attempts in the 20th century at American attempts at interventionism and occupation in Latin America.

The United States now has only one incorporated territory left: the United States Territory of Palmyra Island, a remote, uninhabited coral atoll in the middle of the Pacific Ocean. It had been part of the incorporated Territory of Hawaii until 1959, when Palmyra was deliberately excluded from the new State of Hawaii by the Hawaii Admission Act, so Palmyra was left as a remnant of the old federal territory, still "incorporated", so the Constitution applies there in full.

For Puerto Rico, the outcomes of the Insular Cases laid a foundation for the modern "political question" of Puerto Rican status in relation to the United States, in which Puerto Ricans continue to be classified as alien. The incorporation doctrine's "uncertainty" has allowed U.S. courts the ability to discriminate against Puerto Rican plaintiffs on issues of individual welfare and entitlement into the current day.

Amy Kaplan argues that the Insular Cases helped create the legal backing of the Guantánamo Bay Detention Camp in Guantánamo, Cuba, where constitutional rights "remain indeterminate".

See also 
 Insular area
 Guano Islands Act
 Guantánamo Bay
 Philippine–American War
 Puerto Rico
 Unincorporated territories of the United States

References

Further reading 
 Neuman, Gerald L., and Tomiko Brown-Nagin, eds. Reconsidering the Insular Cases: The Past and Future of the American Empire (Harvard University Press, 2015).
 Rennie, Russell. "A qualified defense of the Insular Cases." New York University Law Review 92 (2017): 1683+ online.

 Sparrow, Bartholomew H. “The Centennial of Ocampo v. United States: Lessons from the Insular Cases.” in Reconsidering the Insular Cases: The Past and Future of the American Empire, edited by Gerald L. Neuman and Tomiko Brown-Nagin, (Harvard University Press, 2015), pp. 39–60. online
 Sparrow, Bartholomew H. The insular cases and the emergence of American empire (Landmark Law Cases & American, 2006).
 Torruella, Juan R. "Ruling America's colonies: The insular cases." Yale Law and Policy Review 32 (2013): 57+ online.

Cases
 Consejo de Salud Playa de Ponce v. Rullan. 586 F.Supp.2d 22 (2008). Consejo de Salud Playa de Ponce, et al., Plaintiffs v. Johnny Rullan, Secretary of Health of the Commonwealth of Puerto Rico, Defendant. Civil Nos. 06-1260(GAG), 06-1524(GAG). United States District Court, D. Puerto Rico. October 10, 2008. As Corrected November 10, 2008. Retrieved April 1, 2013.
 Opinion and Order: Consejo de Salud de la Playa de Ponce vs. Johnny Rullan, Secretary of Health of the Commonwealth of Puerto Rico.  Gustavo A. Gelpi.  USDC, D of Puerto Rico. San Juan, PR. Civil Numbers 06-1260 (GAG) and 06-1524 (GAG) (Consolidated). November 10, 2008. Retrieved April 1, 2013.
 Boumediene v. Bush 553 U.S. 723 (2008)
 Reid v. Covert 354 U.S. 1 (1957)
 Posadas de Puerto Rico Associates v. Tourism Company of Puerto Rico (478 U.S. 328) (1986)

External links 

 The Insular Empire: America in the Mariana Islands, a one-hour PBS documentary by New Day Films.

1901 in United States case law
Insular areas of the United States
Law of insular areas of the United States
United States Supreme Court cases
United States Supreme Court cases of the Fuller Court
History of racism in the United States